John Alexander Dowie (25 May 18479 March 1907) was a Scottish-Australian minister known as an evangelist and faith healer. He began his career as a conventional minister in South Australia. After becoming an evangelist and faith healer, he immigrated with his family to the United States in 1888, first settling in San Francisco, where he expanded his faith healing into a mail order business. He moved to Chicago in time to take advantage of the crowds attracted to the 1893 World's Fair. After developing a huge faith healing business in Chicago, with multiple homes and businesses, including a publishing house, to keep his thousands of followers, he bought an expansive amount of land north of the city to set up a private community.

There Dowie founded the city of Zion, Illinois, where he personally owned all the land and established many businesses. The operations of the city have been characterized as "a carefully-devised large-scale platform for securities fraud..." His lieutenant initiated an investigation of business practices and deposed him from leadership in 1905. Dowie was given an allowance until his death.

In this period Dowie had also refined his religious organization, naming it in 1903 as the Christian Catholic Apostolic Church.

Personal life and education 
Dowie was born in 1847 in Edinburgh, Scotland to John Murray Dowie, a tailor and preacher, and his wife. In 1860 his parents moved the family to Adelaide, South Australia. John Alexander Dowie worked for a few months in a bootmaker retail and factory business developed by his paternal uncle, Alexander Dowie.

He took various other jobs, advancing to a position as confidential clerk for the resident partner of a firm that was doing a business of $2 million a year.

In 1867 Dowie's father was president of the South Adelaide chapter of the Total Abstinence Society in 1867, and John Alexander was an active member. Around 1868, at the age of 21, Dowie returned to Edinburgh to study theology.

He married his cousin, Jane Dowie, on 26 May 1876. She was the daughter of his father's brother Alexander Dowie and his wife. They had three children: A.J. Gladstone (1877–1945), Jeanie (1879–1885), and Esther (1881–1902).

Ministry in Australia and New Zealand

Congregational Ministry 
After Dowie completed his theological studies, he returned to Australia and was ordained in 1872 as pastor of a Congregational church at Alma, South Australia (near Hamley Bridge). Dowie then received and accepted a call in 1873 to a pastorate at Manly, New South Wales before moving to Newtown in 1875.

The Salvation Army 
About this time he gave up his pastorate as a Congregational clergyman. For a time he was involved with the Salvation Army. After his move from Sydney to Melbourne in the early 1880s, he attracted many followers. In 1882, he was invited to the Sackville Street Tabernacle, Collingwood. After his authoritarian leadership led to a split in the church, Dowie was fined and jailed for more than a month for leading unauthorized processions. He gave his account of the incident in Sin in The Camp.

Dowie developed an interest in faith healing in the early 1880s after witnessing the excitement and cures affected by George Milner Stephen,  and became an independent evangelist, founding the International Divine Healing Association. He held meetings in a theatre and claimed powers as a faith healer. A businessman signed over a church building to Dowie as his personal property. This insured  building then burnt down in a suspicious fire that the pro-temperance Dowie blamed on "pro liquor interests". The event was covered in both local and London newspapers.

Free Christian Church of Melbourne 

Dowie established the Free Christian of Melbourne in 1883, which he pastored until he left with his family for the U.S.A. by New Zealand in March 1888.

Dowie toured New Zealand in 1887-8 to conduct a series of meetings to promote Divine Healing, including one at Christchurch, at which James Albert Abbott claimed to be instantly healed of his life-threatening afflictions. When Dowie toured New Zealand again early in 1888 on his way to the U.S.A., he established The Christchurch Association for the Promotion of Healing through Faith in Jesus, with Abbott as its founding secretary. Later in 1888, Abbott arrived in Melbourne to take up the work at the Free Christian Church, where he was elected pastor in 1890.

Life in the United States
Dowie immigrated with his family in 1888 to the United States.

California 
He first settled in San Francisco, California and built up a following by performing faith healings across the state. His ministry, the International Divine Healing Association, was run largely as a commercial enterprise. All members were expected to tithe. Those who did were eligible to request Dowie's aid in healing their ills. They made such requests by mail or telegram (or later, by telephone). Dowie prayed in response to requests by paid-up members. Although Dowie funded his lifestyle largely through tithes, he also liked to buy up securities of bankrupt companies and sell them to his members. Two women whom he had defrauded in this way sued him and won their cases.

Chicago 
In the aftermath of this legal and public relations defeat, Dowie moved to Chicago in 1890. After a few unsuccessful years, he gained fame by his activities on property rented adjacent to the World's Fair in 1893. There he staged elaborate "Divine Healings" in front of large audiences drawn from attendees to the fair. Many of these "healings" were staged: Dowie used audience plants and other dubious methods. For instance, he arranged for carefully screened individuals to be brought on stage to be healed. Dowie appeared to cure a range of psychosomatic illnesses with his stagecraft.

With the growth in numbers of Dowie's following in Chicago, in 1894 he established the Zion Tabernacle downtown. He held regular services for large crowds at Chicago's Central Music Hall. He launched his own publishing house, Zion Publishing, and started a weekly newsletter titled Leaves of Healing.

In 1896 Dowie disbanded the International Divine Healing Association to form the Christian Catholic Church in Zion. He renamed it as the Christian Catholic Apostolic Church in 1903.

By the late 1890s, Zion headquarters had moved to the seven-story Zion Home on Michigan Avenue. This building also housed many worshippers in residence from all walks of life; nearby were the New Zion Tabernacle, Zion Junior School, Zion College, Zion Printing, and the Zion Hall of Seventies. Dowie also established the Zion Home of Hope, more Zion Tabernacles, and various healing homes in Chicago. He leased Chicago's Auditorium Building to accommodate the swelling crowds attending his services. Beyond Chicago, his teaching spread through evangelists and publications across the U.S. and around the world. As his following expanded, Dowie also faced considerable criticism. In 1895 he was in court fighting charges that he was practicing medicine without a license.

City of Zion 
With a following of some approximately 6,000, he sought land north of Chicago and secretly bought a large amount of real estate. In 1900, he announced the founding of the city of Zion, 40 miles from Chicago: he personally owned all the property. He established a theocratic political and economic structure and prohibited smoking, drinking, eating pork, and the practice of any form of modern medicine. He also established a range of businesses, healing homes, and a large Tabernacle. Followers from across the world descended on Zion.

Zion has been characterized as "a carefully-devised large-scale platform for securities fraud requiring significant organizational, legal, and propagandistic preparation to carry out." To this end Dowie forced his followers to deposit their funds in Zion Bank. It appeared to be a registered entity but was, in fact, an unincorporated entity under his control. He also sold stock in an array of Zion's businesses which proved worthless. The entire structure of Zion was continually in debt, and eventually crashed as Dowie became increasingly senile and unable to handle his affairs.

T.P. O'Connor, an Irish M.P. and journalist, wrote of Dowie: 
"the one incomprehensible element in the man's gigantic success is the personal luxury in which he lives, and his superb refusal at the same time to account for any of the sums of money entrusted to him. His horses are worth a fortune in themselves; his carriages are emblazoned with armorial bearings; his wife is said to dress with the gorgeous extravagance of an empress. When he travels, hemmed round with a little army of servants, the prophet of humility and self-denial has a special train chartered, and whenever the spiritual burdens become too great a tax there is a delightful country residence belonging to him in which to retreat from the clamour and importunate appeals of the faithful.

His wife and children left him. In 1904, he revisited Adelaide, Australia, but his efforts to conduct services were met with hostility.

In 1905, he suffered a stroke, and traveled to Mexico to recuperate. While absent from Chicago, he was deposed from his business affairs by Wilbur G. Voliva, his chief lieutenant.

Voliva and official investigators maintained that anywhere from $2.5 to 3.4 million of funds were unaccounted for. Dowie attempted to recover his authority through litigation, but he was ultimately forced to retire and accept an allowance, which was paid until his death in 1907. Dowie is buried in Lake Mound Cemetery, Zion, Illinois.

Theology and influence
Dowie was a restorationist and sought to recover the "primitive condition" of the Church. He believed in an end-times restoration of spiritual gifts and apostolic offices to the Church. In 1899, he claimed to be "God's Messenger" and, in 1901, he claimed to be the spiritual return of the Biblical prophet Elijah, and styled himself as "Elijah the Restorer", "The Prophet Elijah", or "The Third Elijah". He was also an advocate of divine healing and was highly critical of other teachers on healing. This criticism largely stemmed from differences of opinion on the use of "means" or medicine; Dowie was for total reliance on divine healing and against the use of all forms of medicine. He opened a number of healing homes where people could come for instruction in healing and for specific prayer. He emphasized faith in God, "entire consecration", and holiness.

Dowie was a forerunner of Pentecostalism, and many of his followers became influential figures in the early twentieth century revival. Though Dowie did not visit South Africa, his emissary Daniel Bryant between 1904 and 1908 established churches at Wakkerstroom and on the Witwatersrand. After Bryant left these churches proliferated into a number of denominations of Zionist Churches, all claiming their origin in Zion, Illinois, which together constitute the largest group of Christians in South Africa.

Publications 
Dowie published Rome's Polluted Springs in 1877, the substance of two lectures given at the Masonic Hall, Sydney. In 1879 he published The Drama, The Press and the Pulpit, revised reports of two lectures given the previous March.

Contest with Mirza Ghulam Ahmad
Dowie is of particular significance to the Ahmadiyya movement in Islam due to a well-publicized contest that took place in the early 1900s between himself and the movement's founder Mirza Ghulam Ahmad (1835–1908). Dowie had claimed to be the forerunner of Christ's second coming and was particularly hostile towards Islam, which he believed Christ would destroy upon his return. In northern India, Ahmad had claimed to be the coming of Christ in the spirit as well as the promised Mahdi of Islam, who would usher in the final victory of Islam on earth. In 1902, Ahmad invited Dowie to a contest, proposing a "prayer duel" between the two in which both would pray to God that whichever of them was false in his prophetic claim die within the lifetime of the truthful. The challenge attracted some media attention in the United States and was advertised by a number of American newspapers at the time which portrayed the contest as one between two eccentric religious figures. Dowie, however, dismissed the challenge. Ahmad reissued it the following year adding a unilateral death prophecy.

References

Further reading
Barry Chant, The Spirit of Pentecost (Emeth, 2011)

External links

John Alexander Dowie, American First Fruits
JOHN ALEXANDER DOWIE: A MINISTER OF DIVINE HEALING, Dowie website
Leaves of Healing: the Life, Ministry, and Message of John Alexander Dowie
Leaves of Healing: A Weekly Paper Edited by the Rev John Alex. Dowie - archives 1894-1909

1847 births
1907 deaths
American city founders
American evangelists
American faith healers
People from Adelaide
Clergy from Edinburgh
People from Zion, Illinois
American critics of Islam
Elijah
Founders of new religious movements
Christian critics of Islam
Religious leaders from Chicago